James Zachery (August 27, 1958 – January 25, 1994) was an American football defensive lineman who played eight seasons in the Canadian Football League with the Montreal Alouettes, Montreal Concordes and Edmonton Eskimos. He was drafted by the New York Jets in the eleventh round of the 1980 NFL Draft. He played college football at Texas A&M University and attended Midland High School in Midland, Texas. Zachery was a member of the Edmonton Eskimos team that won the 75th Grey Cup. He was also a CFL West All-Star in 1986.

Zachery died on January 25, 1994, after he was the victim of a gang attack. 17-year-old De-Vann Stewart was initially charged with Zachary's murder. Stewart was later sentenced to 20 years on a manslaughter conviction and a second defendant, Don Jackson, was convicted of aggravated assault and sentenced to 50 years in prison.

See also
List of Canadian Football League records (individual)

References

External links
Just Sports Stats
Fanbase profile

1958 births
1994 deaths
Players of American football from Texas
American football defensive ends
Canadian football defensive linemen
African-American players of American football
African-American players of Canadian football
Texas A&M Aggies football players
Montreal Alouettes players
Montreal Concordes players
Edmonton Elks players
People murdered in Texas
Male murder victims
American murder victims
People murdered by American organized crime
People from Midland, Texas
20th-century African-American sportspeople